Assorted Secrets is a compilation of live and studio rehearsals released by American art rock group the Residents in 1984, originally as a cassette-only release due to the recording and performance quality not meeting the group's standards at the time. Not originally meant to be heard by the public, the cassette was eventually produced and released for much-needed profit following the financial difficulties of the Mole Show tour.

Track listing

 Tracks 1-7 were recorded in fall of 1981.
 Tracks 8-10 were recorded on May 5, 1983.

2000 CD reissue

References

External links
 

The Residents albums
1984 albums
Ralph Records albums